Olga Quiñones Fernández (Salinas (Castrillón), Asturias, 1940 - Valencia, June 6, 2014) was a Spanish lawyer and feminist, who was a professor at the University of Valencia, in 1985 being the first president of the Valencian School Board. She was vice president of the Association of University Women (1974–76) since that time she maintains contact with the feminist movement for life. In 2012, Olga Quiñones received the "Dona Commitment in Les Politiques d'Igualtat" Prize from Dones Progressistes for her work and her commitment to equality policies.

References

1940 births
2014 deaths
Spanish women lawyers
People from Asturias